South Kilkenny was a UK Parliament constituency in Ireland.

Boundaries and boundary changes
This county constituency comprised the southern part of County Kilkenny. From 1885 to 1922 it returned one Member of Parliament. It was redrawn in 1918 as a result of the abolition of the Kilkenny City constituency and the transfer of part of the town of New Ross to County Wexford and the transfer of the Kilculliheen area to County Kilkenny from Waterford city under the 1898 Local Government Act.

1885–1918: The baronies of Callan, Ida, Iverk and Knocktopher, and that part of the barony of Gowran contained within the parishes of Ballylinch, Columbkille, Famma, Graiguenamanagh, Inistioge, Jerpoint Abbey, Jerpoint West, Kilfane, Pleberstown, Thomastown and Ullard.

1918–1922: The rural districts of Callan, Carrick-on-Suir No. 3, Ida, Thomastown and Waterford No. 2.

Before the 1885 United Kingdom general election the area was part of the Kilkenny County constituency. The constituency ceased to be entitled to be represented in the UK House of Commons on the dissolution of 26 October 1922, shortly before the Irish Free State came into legal existence on 6 December 1922.

First Dáil
The constituency was, in Irish republican theory, entitled to return one Teachta Dála (known in English as a Deputy) in 1918 to serve in the Irish Republic's First Dáil. Sinn Féin used the UK general election in 1918 to elect the Dáil. The revolutionary body assembled on 21 January 1919. The list of members read out on that day included everyone elected in Ireland. Only the Sinn Féin Deputies participated in the Dáil, but the other Irish MPs could have done so if they had chosen to adhere to the Republic.

The First Dáil, passed a motion at its last meeting on 10 May 1921, the first three parts of which make explicit the republican view.
 That the Parliamentary elections which are to take place during the present month be regarded as elections to Dáil Éireann.
 That all deputies duly returned at these elections be regarded as members of Dáil Éireann and allowed to take their seats on subscribing to the proposed Oath of Allegiance.
 That the present Dáil dissolve automatically as soon as the new body has been summoned by the President and called to order.

The Second Dáil first met on 16 August 1921, thereby dissolving the First Dáil.

Sinn Féin had decided to use the polls for the Northern Ireland House of Commons and the House of Commons of Southern Ireland as an election for the Irish Republic's Second Dáil. No actual voting was necessary in Southern Ireland as all the seats were filled by unopposed returns. Except for Dublin University all other constituencies elected Sinn Féin TDs. As with the First Dáil, the other Deputies could have joined the Dáil if they chose.

From the Third Dáil onwards the Dáil represented only the twenty-six counties which formed the Irish Free State.

In the 2nd and 3rd Dála Kilkenny South formed part of the Carlow–Kilkenny constituency.

Politics
Sinn Féin defeated the Irish Parliamentary Party by better than 4 to 1 in the 1918 election. James O'Mara (1873 – 21 November 1948) had been Nationalist MP for the constituency 1900–1907. He had resigned the seat when he joined Sinn Féin.

Members of Parliament

Notes:-
 1 Not an election, but the date of a party change. The Irish Parliamentary Party had been created in 1882, on the initiative of Charles Stewart Parnell's Irish National League. Both the IPP and the INL split into Parnellite and Anti-Parnellite factions, in December 1890. The Parnellites remained members of the Irish National League after the split and the Anti-Parnellites organised the Irish National Federation in March 1891. The two organisations and the United Irish League merged in 1900, to re-create the Irish Parliamentary Party.
 2 Date of polling day. The result was declared on 28 December 1918, to allow time for votes cast by members of the armed forces to be included in the count.

Elections

Elections in the 1880s

Elections in the 1890s

Elections in the 1900s

Murphy is declared bankrupt, prompting a by-election.

Elections in the 1910s

See also
 Historic Dáil constituencies
 Dáil Éireann (Irish Republic)
 Members of the 1st Dáil

References

External links
 https://www.oireachtas.ie/en/members/
 http://historical-debates.oireachtas.ie/en.toc.dail.html

Westminster constituencies in County Kilkenny (historic)
Dáil constituencies in the Republic of Ireland (historic)
Constituencies of the Parliament of the United Kingdom established in 1885
Constituencies of the Parliament of the United Kingdom disestablished in 1922
Historic constituencies in County Kilkenny